Peter J. Costigan (January 16, 1930 – December 31, 2015) was an American politician who served in the New York State Assembly from the 2nd district from 1966 to 1974.

He died of cancer on December 31, 2015, in Setauket-East Setauket, New York at age 85.

References

1930 births
2015 deaths
Republican Party members of the New York State Assembly